Daniel L. Burke (October 25, 1868 – March 20, 1933) was a reserve catcher/outfielder in Major League Baseball who played briefly for the Rochester Broncos and the Syracuse Stars in , and with the Boston Beaneaters in . Listed at 5' 10", 190 lb., Burke batted and threw right-handed. He was born in Abington, Massachusetts.

In a 42-game career, Burke was a .175 hitter (22-for-126) with 15 runs, one double, nine RBI, and a .307 on-base percentage without any home runs.

Death
Burke died at the age of 64 in Taunton, Massachusetts.

External links

Boston Beaneaters players
Rochester Broncos players
Syracuse Stars (AA) players
Major League Baseball catchers
Major League Baseball outfielders
Baseball players from Massachusetts
1868 births
1933 deaths
19th-century baseball players
Brockton (minor league baseball) players
Lowell Magicians players
Scranton Miners players
Jersey City Skeeters players
Rochester Jingoes players
Providence Clamdiggers (baseball) players
Brockton Shoemakers players
Lewiston (minor league baseball) players
New Bedford Whalers (baseball) players
New Bedford Browns players
Taunton Herrings players